The Homewood Branch of the Carnegie Library of Pittsburgh is a library in Pittsburgh, Pennsylvania. It is located at 7101 Hamilton Avenue in the Homewood South neighborhood and opened on March 10, 1910. It was designed by the architectural firm Alden & Harlow (architect Howard K. Jones was working for the firm at the time),  and it was added to the List of City of Pittsburgh historic designations on July 28, 2004, and the List of Pittsburgh History and Landmarks Foundation Historic Landmarks in 2004.  This library was featured in an episode of Mister Rogers' Neighborhood.

References

Library buildings completed in 1910
Libraries in Pittsburgh
Carnegie libraries in Pennsylvania
1910 establishments in Pennsylvania